Miss World Ecuador 2016, the 4th edition of the Miss World Ecuador was held on October 15, 2016, where Camila Marañón from Manabí crowned Mirka Paola Cabrera Mazzini as her successor Miss World Ecuador 2016.

Results

Placements

Special awards

Contestants

Notes

Debuts

 Carchi
 Galápagos

Returns

Last compete in:

2013 
  Bolívar
 El Oro
2014 
  Pichincha

Withdrawals

  Cotopaxi
 Loja
  Morona Santiago
  Santo Domingo
  Tungurahua

Did Not Compete

 Imbabura - María José Villacís Avendaño

Crossovers
Mirka Cabrera was Reina de Machala 2014. She competed at Reina Mundial del Banano Ecuador 2014 where she was 1st Runne-up; and she competed at Miss Ecuador 2015 where she was unplaced.
Diana Carlosama was 3rd Runner-up at Reina de Esmeraldas 2013.
Andrea Villacrés competed at Reina de Guayaquil 2014 where she was 2nd Runner-up, and she was 1st Runner-up at Reina de Guayas 2015.
María José Villacís competed at Reina de Ibarra 2015 where she was 2nd Runner-up.
Andrea Pendolema was Reina de Babahoyo 2014.

References

Beauty pageants in Ecuador
2016
2016 beauty pageants